The 5th Army Division is a unit of the Peruvian Army.

History
The unit was first created on June 27, 1961, with the name 5th Military Region. On December 31, 2002 the region was disestablished and reestablished as the Oriental Military Region, changing to its current name in 2013. The unit saw combat during the Ecuadorian–Peruvian War as part of the Northern Army Detachment in its northeastern offensive.

The unit's emblem features an outline of the Peruvian department of Loreto, a Sun and a Peruvian soldier.

Organization
The 5th Army Division is formed by the following units:
 5th Jungle Brigade
 35th Jungle Brigade
115th Logistics Brigade

See also
1st Army Division
2nd Army Division
3rd Army Division
4th Army Division
Battle of Rocafuerte

References

Military units and formations of Peru
1961 establishments in Peru